The 1969 Greyhound Derby took place during June with the final being held on 28 June 1969 at White City Stadium.  
The winner was Sand Star and the winning owner Hamilton Orr received £7,252.

Final result 
At White City (over 525 yards):

Distances 
2, 1½, 1, 5, 4 (lengths)
The distances between the greyhounds are in finishing order and shown in lengths. From 1950 one length was equal to 0.08 of one second.

Competition Report
Yellow Printer headed the entry for the Derby for the second consecutive year; he was priced at a short 8-1 ahead of Flaming King and Winter Hope at 16-1. Other market leaders included last year’s finalist Shady Begonia, Finolas Yarn (the recent winner of the Callanan Cup but now representing owner Cyril Young and Tommy Johnston at Wembley) and Sand Star kennelled with Eric and Gwen Adkins in Northampton and looked after by kennelmaid Barbara Tompkins. Finolas Yarn went lame during the qualifying heats.

Yellow Printer won his first round in 28.82 but his time was only the fourth fastest of the eight heats, Sand Star and Doubtful Venture both recorded 28.82 with 'Infatuated' winning in 28.84. After the first round Sand Star was subject to an £8,000 post first-round offer from Yellow Printer's owners Pauline Wallis and Sir Robert Adeane which was rejected. Cals Pick and Shady Begonia were notable first round casualties.

The second round drew Yellow Printer with Sand Star and top Wembley hound Kilbelin Style. The latter was beaten by the late run of Sand Star with Pallas Joy grabbing third place which meant for the second year in succession Yellow Printer had gone out early. Doubtful Venture failed to progress but Valiant Ray picked up a second success, the only greyhound apart from Sand Star to remain unbeaten.

Sand Star caught Kilbelin Style in the semi-finals winning by a short head in a repeat of their second round race. Barrack Street claimed third from Valiant Ray. The other semi produced a blanket finish with Hard Held getting the photo finish decision from Petrovitch and Ploverfield Dan, the unlucky favourite Pallas Joy was badly bumped and knocked out.

Sand Star and Kilbelin Style dominated the betting for the final and the race was over quickly because Sand Star made a good break and was soon drawing clear. Kilbelin Style reduced the deficit and ran well for second place.

Quarter finals

Semi finals

See also
1969 UK & Ireland Greyhound Racing Year

References

Greyhound Derby
English Greyhound Derby
English Greyhound Derby
English Greyhound Derby